Ahmed Belbachir Haskouri (1908–1962) was a prominent member of the royal court of Morocco during the protectorate period. His name was also transliterated as Si Hamed Ben Baxir Escuri or Escurri, Sidi Ahmed Bel Bashir Haskouri, Ahmer Ben Bazir Hasqouri, Ahamad BenbachirScourie, Sid Ahmed Ben-El Bachil Scuri, and Ahmad Ben Bachir El Hascori.

After independence in 1955, he aided the administrative merger of the two previously separated zones. He then became a Moroccan diplomat, appointed by the palace rather than the Foreign Ministry, to the United Kingdom, where he worked for Algerian independence.. Belbachir is known as a philanthropist, according to the Moroccan writer and historian, Mohammed Raissouni.

Family
Ben Azouz, the first prime minister of Spanish Morocco around 1912, was the most powerful Moroccan in Spanish Morocco at the time and was also known to be a nationalist. Since Belbachir's father was previously a military governor in charge of royal protocol in Marrakesh during pre-colonial times, Ben Azouz, a native of Marrakesh, was able to befriend him.

Structure of the protectorate
Spanish and French Morocco were protectorates rather than colonies.

The relationship between French and Spanish Morocco was an agglutinative one as per the Algeciras Conference. This conference that took place shortly before 1912, the year of occupation, stated that Spain and France shall divide Morocco and that the former occupier shall leave whenever the latter occupier does so. The Concise Encyclopedia of Arabic Civilization states that the sultan appointed as representative a viceroy holding, by delegation, sovereign power. Ferro's article in Le Monde newspaper states that even though the sultan was technically Morocco's sovereign, the Spaniards, for the most part, increasingly treated the Khalifa (viceroy), representative of the sultan in Spanish Morocco, as an independent entity. Abramovici's article in the French newspaper called L'Illustré, supports Ferro's statement about the Khalifa's autonomy, but further defines the Khalifa's position by stating that he had his own flag, decoration and hymn and that he was referred to by the public as "sidna" (sire). A Spanish newspaper called La Offensiva, complements both Ferro and Abramovici by stating that the Khalifa had his own throne.

The Spaniards treated the Khalifa as a head of state in many different situations. For example, when Marshal Philippe Pétain was ambassador to Spain, he made it a point to visit the Khalifa. During other visits in Spain, the Khalifa would sit in the same car with General Francisco Franco as the car paraded the streets in Madrid. In sum, to make it clear to the world that the Spaniards viewed the Khalifa as a head of state, the Spanish government awarded him the necklace of the order of Carlos III, an award that can only be bestowed upon heads of states by the Spanish monarch.

Rise to power
Belbachir made sure that such khalifal power maintained its sovereignty by enforcing and enlivening it. As time went by, the Spanish authorities came to the realization that the dialogue was strictly with Belbachir. After much political discussion with the Spanish authorities, Belbachir acquired enough leeway to act on his own initiative under certain circumstances. At one point, Belbachir chose to decorate Mustafa el-Nahhas, the first secretary-general of the Arab League, in the name of the Khalifa. Furthermore, Dr. Shuqairi, the undersecretary of the Arab League, personally visited Belbachir in Tetuan to further reinforce Spanish Morocco's position in the Arab League.  Belbachir also awarded a medal to Shuqairi in the name of the Khalifa . This gave Spanish Morocco (in the name of the Khalifa) certain credibility in the eyes of the Arab world.

To maintain solidarity in the name of the Khalifa with French Morocco, Belbachir saw to it that the foreign policy was always balanced by keeping the sultan in French Morocco aware. This was primarily maintained by keeping Ahmed Ben Masoud, the sultan's private secretary, posted. For the most part the sultan had no serious grievances, given the delegated powers bestowed upon the Khalifa. There was only one exception to the rule when the sultan sent Belbachir several messages insisting that the Khalifa should not wear an Ottoman outfit, a perceived symbol of a "western" imperial power, especially when foreign dignitaries were present.

An inherited "colonial" problem
In essence, Belbachir entered this political scene after the Khalifa's position was fully defined, but it was not enforced at the time that the Spanish protectorate came into existence. He entered this political scene after the occupation was already in place for almost twenty years. Belbachir's tenure was during the second khalifate, a period that starts two years after the death of the first Khalifa in 1923 in Spanish Morocco. During the period from 1923 to 1925, a regent was playing the role of the Khalifa. Upon the recommendation of a few potentates such as Ben Azouz, the second son of the first Khalifa seized the throne.

Absence in major Moroccan and world history books
In 1949, Ben Brahim posed the "big" question about who was behind the major and increasingly ceremonial activities from way back that culminated with one that was tantamount to One Thousand and One Nights that occurred in Spanish Morocco. As implied by Ben Brahim, this politician's political biography cannot be found anywhere because Spanish/Moroccan history has not mentioned Ahmed Belbachir Haskouri enough. Consequently, the world as a whole has known less about him. This understanding holds water partly because Morocco's curricular canon during post-independence was primarily shaped by the dominant elite and secondarily shaped by the political parties. Furthermore, provincialism, coming form the city of Tetuan, the capital of Spanish Morocco and the city where he had no pre-existing roots, has also made a contribution to a greater or lesser degree along those lines insofar as official publications are concerned.

On the other hand, historians during the Spanish government under Franco were unwilling to write about a politician who was a Moroccan nationalist and who was an obstacle to Spanish interests in Northern Africa. However, his name is omnipresent in the Spanish archives about Spanish Morocco that belong to Spain's national libraries.

In contrast, some Moroccan historians and writers felt awkward about giving credit to someone who was operating in juxtaposition with the Spanish occupiers, thereby becoming a protectorate authority. This belief is erroneous for Belbachir who was born when the colonizers were already at the doorsteps of Morocco. Furthermore, someone needed to fill this position from the Moroccan side.

Other earlier, but less biased historians (Moroccan or Spanish) have erroneously thought that, by using the term Khalifa, the laity would interpret the achievements to be coming from Belbachir. This thinking was due to the life-time symbiotic existence between the Khalifa and Belbachir.

Overarching terms such as the makhzen, government, Khalifa and other terms have been used (intentionally or unintentionally) to circumvent giving the politician credit. By fully analyzing the term Khalifa and the marginal role that the person holding this title can be limited to, due to circumstances, one can say that there is nothing incongruous and/or innovative about giving credit to the decision-maker rather than to the one who signs and seals the documents. .

Family and educational background
Ahmed Belbachir Haskouri was born in Marrakesh, Morocco. Mohammed Daoud tutored both the Khalifa and Belbachir in Tétouan's palace where they both grew up. Belbachir was born into an aristocratic family allied to the Alaouite dynasty  of Morocco through previous marital alliances and a long-standing high level service to various sheikdoms under the sultans of Morocco.  (1229-1574). Eventually,  from the area that became their new home. In the course of time, .

.

Later, he married Lalla Zoubeida Raissouni in 1950. . Sadiq was also ex-finance minister of the first khalifal government and both cousin and previous "interlocuteur" (political broker) of Mulai Ahmed er Raisuni. Mulai Ahmed was the most adamant rebel against both domestic and foreign powers during pre-colonial and colonial times and was later portrayed as the hero in the American movie called The Wind and the Lion. This alliance politically upgraded Belbachir in northern Morocco. Consequently, it made the public more receptive to the position of the Khalifa, .

Political ideologies

Belbachir was anti-Nazi, anti-communist   and pro-monarchist with progressive views. .

Belbachir's political ideologies can be further understood through future encounters with the Spanish leaders. . .

Place in Moroccan and world history
Belbachir was one of the most prominent political figures in Spanish Morocco and was often alluded to as the "Éminence grise" of the caliph of Spanish Morocco as conveyed in 1988 by a Moroccan historian, Abdelmajid Benjelloun. Jean Wolf, a Belgian historian, further supported the term "Éminence grise" in 1994.

He was the intermediary between the Sultan Mohammed V in French Morocco and the caliph of Spanish Morocco. He was also the only negotiator between Franco and the caliph as regularly evidenced by the Spanish newspaper called ABC especially by 1956. For example, . Furthermore, .

Additionally, he was the  politician from Spanish Morocco who could socially and politically communicate, especially during times of crises, with nineteenth-century politicians who were still around in the 1950s.  to maintain balance and unity between the two protectorates. Furthermore, the Grand Vizier of French Morocco at the time.

Similarly, Belbachir is historically known to be in the higher social circles a  politician from Spanish Morocco who negotiated, to the satisfaction of all domestic and foreign powers as well as Abd el-Krim's, the last phase of the latter's exile. That came to pass when . .

Belbachir was a politician from Spanish Morocco who could communicate and financially support all the political parties in "colonial times". He was continuously touching base with the Istiqlal, Reformist (Islah), Unionist (Wahda) and Council (Shura) parties.. .

Similarly, .

. As time went by, he also chose many new employees that the Spaniards did not hesitate to approve of. In other words, the lack of a well-defined structure historically experienced gave way to the eventual crystallization of a new system that kept the former and new employees in check within the hierarchy. Miguel Marin stated that, by 1955, a new caliphal government emerged that included nationalists such as Abdallah Guennoun. However, the missing fact in Martin's account is that .

Belbachir is also known to be a politician in the entire history of Spanish Morocco who politically dealt with fifteen consecutive High Commissioners, most of whom were generals, representing the Spanish government. Some of these commissioners were from the pre-republic, republic  and Franco's time. In light of this, it goes without saying that every newly appointed High Commissioner had to inform Belbachir about his forthcoming arrival to Morocco to initiate a new dialogue. What is noteworthy herein is that General Franco was one of these commissioners at one point.

.

.

.

.

.

Finally, Belbachir was the first rebel during the Spanish Civil War to express a religious motivation. This was achieved by placing such dissidence on record in the name of the caliph. Therefore, the caliph's name went down on record to that effect.

Positions in the khalifate
Belbachir held high positions during the Spanish occupation, including Chief of Staff of the Khalifa, Chief of the Civil Household, Director General of the Secretariat of the Khalifa, Secretary General of the Privy Council of the Hhalifa and Secretary General of the makhzen. Other positions were not officially granted, but implied, where the Khalifa had no objections to Belbachir playing the chamberlain's role. American writers Dmitri Kessel and Paul Bowles described him as "advisor to the Khalifa". Similarly, in November 1949, La Ofensiva, a Spanish newspaper, referred to him as the chamberlain, receiving top officials of Franco's government in celebration of the
Khalifa's throne day.

The accumulation of high positions together with his makhzen background and Spanish education allowed him to dominate Moroccan politics. Abdelmajid Benjelloun, in his doctoral dissertation, summed up Belbachir as the major architect and the pillar of the vice-regal system, the khalifal government, and key to communication with the Spanish authorities.

Later career
Belbachir used his power in Morocco to create and improve social programs and education, in discussion with the Spanish High Commissioners. This included preservation of Andalusian music in Morocco, and allowed Morocco to get into a more accommodating common platform with its Eastern and Northern neighbors. Belbachir worked on these social and political ties with Europe and the Arab World in a time of turmoil. During World War II he used the Spanish government to thwart the Nazis by offering visas and passports from Spanish Morocco to Jews.

Belbachir died in London in 1962.

References

Bibliography

 Academia de infanteria de Toledo (April 6, 1956). ABC.

 "Amama Qasr Khalifi El Amer" (In Front of the khalifal Palace) (May 1950) Al Anis p. 22.

 Benaboud Mohammed (March 1987) "Min wathiqa Maktab Al Magrib Al Arabi fi Qahira." (From the documentation of the Maghrebi Office in Cairo).  Mawqif Majalat Thaqafia. p. 133.
 Benaboud Mohammed (1950). "Risalat ductur Ahmed Benaboud min Qahira ila Faqih Mohammed Afailal" (A Message from Doctor Ahmed Benaboud from Cairo to the Faki Mohammed Afailal in Tetuan). Tetuan, Morocco: Manshuwat Jumiat Tetuan Asmir.
 Bencheikh, S. (2008, August). Bey'  Enquette sur un archaisme, Telquel, 334, 38-48.

 Ben Brahim, Mohammed (1949). "Ilayka Ya Ni Ma Sadiq"(To you my dear friend). Tetuan, Morocco: Hassania Publishing Company.
 Benumaya, Gil (1940). El Jalifa en Tanger.  Madrid: Instituto Jalifiano de Tetuan.
 Bonini, Emmanuel (2000). La veritable Josephine Baker. Paris: Pigmalean Gerard Watelet.

 Comida de gala en el palacio de oriente. (April 6, 1956). ABC. p. 17.
 Cushion, Steve (2009). "The Question of Moroccan independence and its effect on the Spanish Civil War". Retrieved July 14, 2009.
 Delero, M., Hakim, M. (1987). "Torres Mufti alayhi." (Torres interprets it) Tetuan, Morocco: Shuwiyakh Publishing Company.

 El Glaoui, Abdessadeq (2004). Le Ralliement. Le Glaoui Mon Père. Rabat, Morocco:  Marsam Publishing Company.
 "El Alto Comisario visita el jalifa". (November 11, 1954). ABC p. 10.

 "El Jalifa en Ronda". (August 31, 1935). ABC, p. 10.
 "El Jefe de Estado recibe el Jalifa" (May 27, 1942). ABC, p 27.
 "El Jalifa viaja de regreso a Marruecos" (January 1952). ABC, p. 15.
 "Etudes D'histoire Marocain" (1987). Revue dar Niaba. P.1–10

 Hafez, Sabry (2003). "Mohammed Shoukri". Retrieved Jan 1, 2009.
 Goda, Norman J.W. (1996). Seidel, Carlos Collado Seidel, "Zufluchtsstatte fur Nationalsozialisten? Spanien, die Alliierten und die Behandlung deutscher Agenten 1944-1947". Main, U.S: H-Net.
 Kessel, Dimitri (June 20, 1949). A Sultan's Daughter Weds a Caliph. Life Magazine, p. 23.
 Les partisans de ben youssef proclameraient un regent (January 1954). La Tribune De Geneve.
 Llega El Jalifa Al Campamento (March 1941). Espana. P.2.
 Llega a Madrid la Esposa del Jalifa (March 24, 1956). ABC p. 8.
 Llegada del Jalifa a Madrid (May 26, 1942). ABC p. 15.

 Martinez-Mena, Miguel (March 31, 1955). Alicante Eleccion de la "Ballea del Foc". La Vanguardia Española, p. 8.
 Masmoudi, Hassan (December 9, 1953). "Jamia Alarabia wal Maghrib" (The Arab Organization and the Maghreb). Al Ma'rifa, p. 1.
 "Mawqif Shamal El Maghrib Min Itidad Ala El Arsh" (The position of Northern Morocco concerning the throne) (February 1953). Muasasat AbdelKhalaq Torres. P. 107.
 Mesfioui, Mohammed (1949). "Ilayka Ya Ni Ma Sadiq"(To you my dear friend). Tetuan, Morocco: Hassania Publishing Company.
 "Min Khalifa Marrakesh Ila Mu'tamar Maghreb El Arabi." (From the khalifa of the king of Morocco to the Conference of the Maghreb). (April 1947). El Ahram.

 "Rais Diwan Madani Khalifi Amama Microfone Bi Munasabat Id Zafaf Khalifi" (The Chief of the khalifal Cabinet on the microphone for the celebration of the khalifal wedding) (June 1949). Al Marifa. P. 7-8.

 Satloff, Robert (2006). Among the Righteous Lost Stories from the Holocaust's Long Reach into Arab Lands. New York: Public Affairs, member of Perseus Books Group.
 Seidel, Carlos Collado (1995). Zufluchtsstatte fur Nationalsozialisten? Spanien, die Alliierten und die Behandlung deutscher Agenten 1944-1947, Vierteljahrshefte fur Zeitgeschic.

 "The Amazing Franco". (February 1, 1954). Time. Retrieved July 12, 2009.

External link

Moroccan diplomats
1962 deaths
1908 births
People from Tétouan